Feonic is a commercial company specialising in the design and development of magnetostrictive audio products and is a spin-off from Hull University.

Products 

The products use a smart material that changes shape in a magnetic field.  This material was developed for sonar devices by the US Navy but is now commercially available. The products developed by Feonic use the force created by the change in shape of this smart material to vibrate structures such as floors, windows, walls, and the acoustically conductive structures of ships to produce sound.

The company's first consumer product, the SoundBug, led to the successful roll out of the Whispering Window, enabling shop windows to produce sound.

The company has developed a new range of “F Drives” to create flat panel speakers with various applications in the transport, pro-audio, domestic, consumer and commercial markets.

The company markets their products for use in a wide range of environments including train stations, shops, homes, and on boats. Advantages over standalone speakers are described as the systems' efficiency, ability to be tightly integrated into structures and products, resistance to damage, and clarity.

History 

The timeline below summarises how Feonic has developed:

 1999	Newlands Scientific plc was incorporated to provide research, development and consultancy services in magnetostrictive devices and exploit the possibilities of Terfenol-D.
 2000	Brian Smith was appointed as Managing Director and the product development process began.
 2002	Soundbug launched at CeBit (the world’s largest technology trade show) and Feonic technology trademarked.
 2003	Newlands Scientific develops Whispering Window and launches Presenter. Soundbug wins Red Dot design award.
 2004	Newlands Scientific becomes Feonic plc and wins UK electronics industry design award for best use of technology.
 2008	New generation F-Drive products are launched and Feonic Transport formed as a joint venture.
 2009	Feonic South East Asia formed as a distributor; a deal has been agreed with Techtonic for Core Vista panels and product certification received from Network Rail.
 2012	Philip Jarvis appointed as Group CEO.

References

External links
FeonicTechnology YouTube Channel

Loudspeaker manufacturers
Audio equipment manufacturers of the United Kingdom